Chan Cheuk Kwong (born 5 December 1984 in Hong Kong), is a Hong Kong  footballer who is currently playing for Hong Kong First Division League club Wong Tai Sin.

He is renowned for his long throw-in ability, often being compared with former Stoke City midfielder Rory Delap.

Club career

Sham Shui Po 
Chan Cheuk Kwong started his football career in Sham Shui Po, competing in the third-tier league. In 3 seasons, he only featured 9 matches for the club, and was released after the 2007–08 season as the club promoted their full youth team to first team.

Five-One-Seven 
He then followed former Sham Shui Po head coach Fung Hoi Man and joined another Third Division club Five-One-Seven. However, since his full-time job was a fireman, he only played 2 matches for the team and left the team after a season.

Southern 
He once again followed Fung Hoi Man and joined fellow Third Division club Southern. He helped the club gain promotion to second-tier league by scoring two goals in nine matches. His long throw-ins were also a key to success.

He became a key member for Southern after the club was promoted. He was a regular starting XI and eventually helped the club promote to the Hong Kong First Division for the first time in club history in 2011–12 season.

As he is a fireman off the football pitch, he could not attend every training session. As a result, his role in the club was changed to super sub. He is often substituted in the second half for long throw ins.

Hoi King 
Having joined Hoi King for the 2017–18 First Division season, head coach Fung Hoi Man confirmed on 7 June 2018 that Chan would be retained by the club for their 2018–19 Hong Kong Premier League campaign.

Career statistics 
 As of 5 May 2013

Notes 
1.  Since Sham Shui Po was competing in lower divisions, they could only join the Junior Shield instead of Senior Shield.
2.  Since Five-One-Seven was competing in lower divisions, they could only join the Junior Shield instead of Senior Shield.
3.  Hong Kong Junior Challenge Shield was not held in the 2009–10 season.
4.  Since Southern was competing in lower divisions, they could only join the Junior Shield instead of Senior Shield.

References

External links 
 
 Chan Cheuk Kwong at HKFA

Hong Kong footballers
Hong Kong Premier League players
Southern District FC players
Sham Shui Po SA players
Yuen Long FC players
Hong Kong Rangers FC players
Hoi King SA players
Association football midfielders
Association football defenders
Chinese firefighters
1984 births
Living people